60S ribosomal protein L21 is a protein that in humans is encoded by the RPL21 gene.

Ribosomes, the organelles that catalyze protein synthesis, consist of a small 40S subunit and a large 60S subunit. Together these subunits are composed of 4 RNA species and approximately 80 structurally distinct proteins. This gene encodes a ribosomal protein that is a component of the 60S subunit. The protein belongs to the L21E family of ribosomal proteins. It is located in the cytoplasm. As is typical for genes encoding ribosomal proteins, there are multiple processed pseudogenes of this gene dispersed through the genome.

Clinical relevance
Mutations in the RPL21 gene result in Hypotrichosis simplex of the scalp.

References

Further reading

External links 
 

Ribosomal proteins